Claro M. Recto Avenue, more popularly known as simply Recto Avenue, is the principal commercial thoroughfare in north-central Manila, Philippines. It spans seven districts just north of the Pasig River in what is generally considered Manila's old downtown area.

Recto's western terminus is at an intersection with Mel Lopez Boulevard (Radial Road 10) at the district boundaries of Tondo and San Nicolas close to the Manila North Harbor. It runs northeast before curving to the east at Juan Luna Street and Estero de Binondo. It then passes through the Divisoria shopping area of Manila south of the Tutuban railway station until it curves southeast past the A. Rivera Street junction.

LRT Line 2 runs along its T. Alonzo–Legarda Street segment. It has a short extension into San Miguel and towards Malacañang Palace compound as Mendiola Street.

History
Recto Avenue was developed by sections in various time periods during the course of Spanish rule. The main section leading to the coast in San Nicolas and Tondo from Binondo was named Paseo de Azcárraga, after the Spanish Filipino Prime Minister of Spain, Marcelo Azcárraga. 

In the Santa Cruz district, the road was divided into Calle General Izquierdo, Calle Paz and Calle Bilibid because of the three creeks (esteros) that ran through the district. In Sampaloc, the road was named Calle Iris, which terminated at Calle Alix (now Legarda Street). The name Paseo de Azcárraga was extended to include the full length of the street, which was also called Paseo de Felipe at one point (after King Philip II of Spain). Finally, in 1961, the avenue was given its present name in honor of the Filipino senator, Claro Mayo Recto.

On July 7, 1892, in a building numbered 72 Calle Azcárraga, at the intersection with Calle Sagunto (now Santo Cristo) in Tondo, Andrés Bonifacio founded the revolutionary society named Katipunan.

In the early 1900s, Azcárraga was a theater-and-restaurant row, with Teatro Libertad and Zorrilla Theatre attracting the well-dressed crowd to  shows and operas that ran on weekends.

Originally terminating at Calle Angalo on the former coastline of Manila in San Nicolas at the east, Azcárraga was extended into the new reclamation accommodated for the Manila North Harbor in the 20th century.

Cultural references
Recto Avenue is infamous as a center of document forgery. Counterfeiters openly advertise their services, although the actual counterfeiting is done elsewhere. The forged documents they sell include IDs, receipts, driver's licenses, diplomas, employment references, theses, pilot's licenses, and seaman's certificates. Due to this, locals have sarcastically dubbed the area as "Recto University". The mayors of Manila have ordered several police raids on the area; however, some police officers reportedly accept bribes from the counterfeiters.

Transportation

Recto Avenue is a major stop on three lines of the Metro Manila Transit System.
 Doroteo Jose station at Rizal Avenue served by LRT Line 1.
 Recto station at Rizal Avenue served by LRT Line 2.
 Tutuban railway station at Dagupan Street served by Philippine National Railways.

The route is also served by several bus companies and jeepneys. Additional stations will be built along the road as part of the Line 2 west expansion project.

Intersections

Landmarks

Shopping malls
 168 Shopping Mall
 999 Shopping Mall
 D8 Mall (formerly Benisons Shopping Center)
 Isetann Cinerama Recto
 Lucky Chinatown
 Odeon Terminal Mall
 Tutuban Center

Universities and colleges
 Access Computer College|Access Computer College - Recto
 Far Eastern University
 Informatics College - Recto
 Philippine College of Health Sciences
 San Sebastian College – Recoletos
 STI Colleges Recto
 University of the East

Other notable buildings
 Basilica of San Sebastian, Manila
 Manila City Jail (Old Bilibid Prison)
 Manila Grand Opera Hotel
 Tutuban railway station

See also
 List of renamed streets in Manila

References

Streets in Manila
Shopping districts and streets in Metro Manila
Tondo, Manila
San Nicolas, Manila
Binondo
Santa Cruz, Manila
Quiapo, Manila
Sampaloc, Manila